Mufti Ghulam Sarwar Lahori (1837 - 14 August 1890) (Urdu: مفتی غلام سرور لاہوری) was an Islamic scholar, Islamic jurist, Historian, theologian, researcher and lexicographer.

Literary works
He authored about 20 books.

 Baharistan-e-Tareekh: Gulzar-e-Shaahi (1877)
 Deewan Hamd-e-Izadi (1909)
 Deewan-e-Sarwari (1872)
 Ganjina-e-Sarwari
 Gulshan-e-Sarwari
 Hadiqat-ul-Auliya (1877)
 Hadiqat-ul-Auliya (1889)
 Hadiqat-ul-Auliya (1976)
 Insha-e-Safdari (1878)
 Jame-ul-Lughaat Urdu (1892)
 Khazinat-ul-Asfiya 
 Naat-e-Sarwari (1911)
 Tareekh Makhzan-e-Punjab (1877)
 Yadgar-e-Asgari (1884)
 Zubdat-ul-Lughat aka Lughat-e-Sarvari (1877)
 Zubdat-ul-Lughat aka Lughat-e-Sarvari (1887)

References

1837 births
1890 deaths
People from Lahore
Lexicographers
19th-century Indian historians
19th-century lexicographers